The VII Constitutional Government was the seventh Constitutional Government (administration or cabinet) under the Constitution of East Timor.  Formed on 15 September 2017, it was led by the country's second Prime Minister, Mari Alkatiri, and was replaced by the VIII Constitutional Government on 22 June 2018.

Composition
The government was made up of Ministers, Deputy Ministers of the Prime Minister, Vice Ministers and Secretaries of State, as follows:

Ministers

Vice Ministers

Secretaries of State

References

Notes

Further reading

External links
Program of the Seventh Constitutional Government (roughly translated from Portuguese) – Government of East Timor
Timor-Leste's Seventh Constitutional Government – La'o Hamutuk: Timor-Leste Institute for Development Monitoring and Analysis

Cabinets established in 2017
Cabinets disestablished in 2018
Constitutional Governments of East Timor
2017 establishments in East Timor
2018 disestablishments in East Timor